Megachile leachella, also known as the silvery leafcutter bee, is a species of solitary bee in the family Megachilidae. This species is widely distributed in the Western Palaearctic region from Southern Fennoscandia to North Africa and the Middle East, however the precise boundaries of the species range is not fully understood. The species was described by John Curtis in 1828.

Description 
Megachile leachella is a small species of Megachile bee, which possesses green eyes when alive. M. leachella's sixth tergite is covered in adpressed white hairs. Females of the species also possess white scopal hairs on their hind legs.

Habitat 
Megachile leachella is mainly found living in coastal habitat such as sand dunes, but is sometimes also found living on shingle beach where sandy patches are present. Very rarely populations can be found living further inland, however only on sandy soils. Megachile leachella is an underground nesting species, which uses leaf and petal cuttings of various plant species when building of their nests.

Ecology 
Megachile leachella is known to feed from the flowers of Lotus corniculatus, L. pedunculatus, Eryngium maritimum, jasione montana and Sedum anglicum. 

The red-legged sharp-tail bee (Coelioxys brevis) is also a parasite of M. leachella.

References

leachella
Insects described in 1828